Forêt-la-Blanche Ecological Reserve is an ecological reserve in Quebec, Canada. It was established on October 8, 2003.

The reserve is notable for its exceptional forest ecosystem, that include stands of mature trees that never been affected by human activity and have suffered very little natural disturbance (e.g. natural decline, windfall, fires).

References

External links
 
 Official website
 Website from Government of Québec

Nature reserves in Outaouais
Protected areas established in 2003
2003 establishments in Quebec